Ekaterina Vasilyevna Bratko (born 17 November 1993) is a Russian footballer who plays as a midfielder and has appeared for the Russia women's national team.

Career
Bratko has been capped for the Russia national team, appearing for the team during the 2019 FIFA Women's World Cup qualifying cycle.

References

External links
 
 
 

1993 births
Living people
Russian women's footballers
Russia women's international footballers
Women's association football midfielders
Kubanochka Krasnodar players
WFC Lokomotiv Moscow players
21st-century Russian women